Maessen or Maesen is a Dutch patronymic surname, meaning son of Maes, an archaic short form of Thomas. It is most common in Dutch Limburg and surrounding regions. Among variant forms are Maas, Maase(n), Maassen, and Maes. Notable people with the surname include:

Barry Maessen (born 1976), Dutch racing driver
Bianca Maessen (born 1950), Dutch pop singer, sister of Patricia and Stella
Bob Maesen (born 1976), Belgian sprint canoer
Liv Maessen, Australian singer active 1969–1974
Patricia Maessen (1952–1996), Dutch pop singer, sister of Bianca and Stella
Stella Maessen (born 1953), Dutch pop singer, sister of Bianca and Patricia

See also
Léontine de Maësen (1835–1906), Belgian coloratura soprano
Paul Therèse van der Maesen de Sombreff (1827–1902), Dutch nobleman, Minister of Foreign Affairs 1864–66
Edmé-Martin Vandermaesen (1767–1813), French general of the French Revolutionary and Napoleonic Wars.

References

Dutch-language surnames
Patronymic surnames
Surnames from given names